

Friedrich-Wilhelm Müller (29 August 1897 – 20 May 1947) was a general in the Wehrmacht of Nazi Germany during World War II. He led an infantry regiment in the early stages of the war and by 1943 was commander of the 22nd Air Landing Division. Under his orders, troops of the division committed atrocities against Greek civilians. He was later commander of occupied Crete and his harsh methods of controlling the island saw him nicknamed "The Butcher of Crete." After the war he was convicted and executed by a Greek court for war crimes.

Biography
Müller was born in Barmen, Prussia. When World War I began, Friedrich-Wilhelm Müller served as an infantryman with the 2nd Infantry Regiment. In 1915, he was promoted to second lieutenant and transferred to the 266th Regiment. After the war, Müller remained in the army and continued to rise through the ranks, attaining the rank of major in 1936. Shortly after World War II commenced, Müller was promoted to lieutenant colonel. 

As the commanding officer of 105th Infantry Regiment, he saw action against the Soviet Army, for which he was awarded the Knight's Cross of the Iron Cross in 1941 and Oak Leaves to his Knight's Cross in 1942.  In August 1942, Müller was appointed commanding officer of 22nd Air Landing Infantry Division. Müller became notorious as a brutal commander responsible for several atrocities against Greek civilians. 

The attacks on civilians included the massacres at Viannos, Anogeia, Amari, Damasta, Skourvoula and Malathyros. During the autumn of 1943, Müller led the German forces in their victory over the Italian-British forces in the Dodecanese Campaign. On 6 October 1943, on the island of Kos, under his orders, German forces killed and buried in mass graves over one hundred Italian army officers captured at the end of the battle for the island, who would not side with their former allies. On 1 July 1944, he replaced Bruno Bräuer as commander of occupied Crete. His infamy earned him the nickname of "The Butcher of Crete."  

Müller was also responsible for the Holocaust of Kedros on 22 August 1944. Under his orders, German infantry killed 164 Greek civilians which was followed in the coming days by the razing of most villages, looting, and the destruction of livestock and harvests. By 1945, Müller commanded the German 4th Army on the Eastern Front. Müller ended the war in East Prussia where he surrendered to the Red Army.

After the war, he was tried by a Greek military court for war crimes. In 1946, Müller was convicted by a Greek court in Athens for the massacres of hostages for reprisals. He was sentenced to death on 9 December 1946 and executed by firing squad on 20 May 1947, along with former General Bruno Bräuer, on the anniversary of the Axis invasion of Crete.

Awards
 Iron Cross (1914) 1st Class (25 May 1916) & 2nd Class (29 August 1916)
 Clasp to the Iron Cross (1939) 1st Class (22 December 1939) & 2nd Class (12 June 1940)
 German Cross in Gold on 18 June 1943 as Generalleutnant and commander of the 22. Infanterie-Division
 Knight's Cross of the Iron Cross with Oak Leaves and Swords
 Knight's Cross on 22 September 1941 as Oberstleutnant and commander of Infanterie-Regiment 105
 86th Oak Leaves on 8 April 1942 as Oberst and commander of Infanterie-Regiment 105
 128th Swords on 27 January 1945 as General der Infanterie and commanding general of the LXVIII. Armeekorps

See also
Viannos massacres
Holocaust of Kedros
Razing of Anogeia
Massacre of Kos

References

Citations

Bibliography

 Beevor, Antony (1991). Crete: The Battle and the Resistance.
 
 
 

1897 births
1947 deaths
German mass murderers
German Army generals of World War II
Generals of Infantry (Wehrmacht)
People from the Rhine Province
Crete in World War II
Recipients of the Gold German Cross
Recipients of the Knight's Cross of the Iron Cross with Oak Leaves and Swords
Nazis executed in Greece
Executed military leaders
Military personnel from Wuppertal
Executed people from North Rhine-Westphalia
20th-century executions by Greece
German occupation of Greece during World War II
German Army personnel of World War I
Executed mass murderers